Saint Hedwig may refer to:

 Saint Hedwig of Silesia, 13th-century saint
 Saint Jadwiga of Poland, 14th-century saint also known as Hedwig
 Saint Hedwig, Texas, a town in the United States